Corolla may refer to:

Corolla (botany), the petals of a flower, considered as a unit
Toyota Corolla, an automobile model name
Corolla (headgear), an ancient headdress in the form of a circlet or crown
Corolla (gastropod), a genus of molluscs
Corolla, North Carolina, a town in the United States